2I or 2-I may refer to:

 Kosmos-2I Soviet rocket
 AceKard 2i, one of the Nintendo DS storage devices
 Base 2i, or Quater-imaginary base
 The binary icosahedral group 2I
 SSH 2I (WA), now U.S. Route 97 in Washington
 The 2i's Coffee Bar in London
 Polikarpov 2I-N1, alternate name for the Polikarpov DI-1 fighter
 Kosmos-2I 63S; see List of Kosmos satellites (1–250)
 2I/Borisov, the first known interstellar comet

See also
I2 (disambiguation)